Alpheias oculiferalis is a species of snout moth in the genus Alpheias. It was described by Émile Louis Ragonot, in 1891, and is known from the US state of Texas.

References

Moths described in 1891
Cacotherapiini
Moths of North America